Southerham Grey Pit is a  geological Site of Special Scientific Interest south-east of Lewes in East Sussex. It is a Geological Conservation Review site.

This site exposes rocks dating to the Cenomanian stage of the Late Cretaceous, around 100 million years ago. It has preserved many inoceramid bivalves which are not found elsewhere in Britain and are important for regional correlation. It is also the last remaining source for fossil fish in the area.

References

Sites of Special Scientific Interest in East Sussex
Geological Conservation Review sites
Glynde